Haingura is a surname. Notable people with the surname include:

Ambrosius Haingura (1957–2000), Namibian activist and politician
Petrina Haingura (born 1959), Namibian politician